The 2014–15 North Florida Ospreys men's basketball team represented the University of North Florida during the 2014–15 college basketball season. The Ospreys competed in Division I of the National Collegiate Athletic Association (NCAA) and the Atlantic Sun Conference (A-Sun). They were led by sixth year head coach Matthew Driscoll, and played their home games at UNF Arena on the university's Jacksonville, Florida campus.

In their sixth season as a full Division I member, the Ospreys won their first Atlantic Sun Conference regular season and tournament championships and received their first ever NCAA tournament bid.  As a No. 16 seed in the south region, they were matched up against fellow No. 16 seed Robert Morris in the First Four in Dayton, Ohio.  They were defeated 77–81 despite leading by 14 points in the second half.

Nevertheless, the Ospreys set a program record for wins in a season and drew unprecedented media attention both locally and nationally.  They earned the #1 seed and home court advantage in the 2015 Atlantic Sun men's basketball tournament, and advanced to the championship game where they defeated USC Upstate in front of a sold-out, record crowd of 6,155.  The season also included two-game sweeps over their crosstown rivals, the Jacksonville Dolphins and conference runner-up Florida Gulf Coast.  On December 6, 2014, the Ospreys upset the Purdue Boilermakers on the road, marking their first ever victory over a Big Ten Conference opponent.

Head coach Matthew Driscoll was named Atlantic Sun Coach of the Year and multiple players earned all-conference honors.

In the Week 18 AP poll released on March 9, 2015, the Ospreys received one top-25 vote, the first such occurrence in program history.

Previous season

The Ospreys finished the 2013–14 season with an overall record of 16–16, 10–8 record in Atlantic Sun play. In the Atlantic Sun Conference tournament, they were defeated in the quarterfinals by USC Upstate, 80–74.

Roster

Schedule and results

|-
!colspan=9 style="background:#031B49; color:white;"| Non-conference regular season

|-
!colspan=9 style="background:#031B49; color:white;"| Atlantic Sun Conference regular season

|-
!colspan=9 style="background:#031B49; color:white;"| Atlantic Sun tournament

|-
!colspan=9 style="background:#031B49; color:white;"| NCAA tournament

Source:

Awards and honors 
 Beau Beech, guard
 Atlantic Sun All-Conference First Team
 Demarcus Daniels, forward
 Atlantic Sun Defensive Player of the Year
 Atlantic Sun All-Academic Team
 Atlantic Sun Tournament MVP
 Finalist, Lefty Driesell National Defensive Player of the Year
 Matthew Driscoll, head coach
 Atlantic Sun Coach of the Year
 Trent Mackey, guard
 Atlantic Sun All-Academic Team
 Dallas Moore, guard
 Atlantic Sun All-Conference First Team
 Atlantic Sun All-Tournament Team
 Jalen Nesbitt, guard
 Atlantic Sun All-Tournament Team

References

North Florida Ospreys men's basketball seasons
North Florida
North Florida
North Florida Ospreys men's basketball
North Florida Ospreys men's basketball